Gensac may refer to the following communes in France:

Gensac, Gironde, in the Gironde department 
Gensac, Hautes-Pyrénées, in the Hautes-Pyrénées department 
Gensac, Tarn-et-Garonne, in the Tarn-et-Garonne department 
Gensac-de-Boulogne, in the Haute-Garonne department
Gensac-la-Pallue, in the Charente department
Gensac-sur-Garonne, in the Haute-Garonne department